Lobophytum caputospiculatum is a species of the genus Lobophytum.

References 

Animals described in 1984